No. 290 Squadron RAF was a Royal Air Force Squadron formed as an anti-aircraft cooperation unit in World War II.

History

Formation in World War II
The squadron formed at  Newtownards on 1 December 1943 and was equipped with  Hurricanes, Oxfords  and Martinets to provide practice for the anti-aircraft defences in Northern Ireland by towing targets and conducting simulated attacks. The squadron moved to West Freugh,  Scotland and then to Knocke le Zout, Belgium where it disbanded on 27 October 1945.

Aircraft operated

References

External links
 History of No.'s 286–290 Squadrons at RAF Web
 290 Squadron history on the official RAF website

290
Military units and formations established in 1943